Marine Ménager (born 26 July 1996) is a  French rugby union player who plays as a winger for the France women's national rugby union team and Montpellier Hérault Rugby.

Career
She started playing rugby aged 7 for LMRC Villeneuve d'Ascq. She also competed in judo for a year. Along with her twin sister Romane Ménager she made her debut in the league aged 18 for Lille MRCV.
In 2016 Marine joined Romane in playing for the French national team.
 

On 23 May, 2018 both sisters joined Montpelier having played for 14 years with Lille MRC Villeneuvois and won the Élite 1 championship in 2016.

Both sisters named in France's fifteens team for the 2021 Rugby World Cup in New Zealand. Marine Ménager was highlighted as one of the form players in the group stages of the tournament. Both sisters started in the French 39-3 win over Italy in the quarter-final.

References

1996 births
Living people
French female rugby union players